Bacchisa chinensis is a species of beetle in the family Cerambycidae. It was described by Breuning in 1948. It is known from China.

References

chinensis
Beetles described in 1948